Bertalan Szemere (27 August 1812 – 18 January 1869) was a Hungarian poet and nationalist who became the third Prime Minister of Hungary during the short period of the Hungarian Revolution of 1848 when Hungary was independent of rule by the Austrian Empire.

Early years

Szemere was born in Vatta into a poor noble family. His father was Major László Szemere, his mother was Erzsébet Karove. Szemere studied in Miskolc, Késmárk and Sárospatak. He was interested in writing poems and his works were published in the periodical  ("Upper-Hungarian Minerva"). He was influenced by Ferenc Kölcsey and Mihály Vörösmarty.

In the reform era

In 1832 Szemere graduated as a jurist and started to work as an apprentice in Pressburg (now Bratislava, Slovakia) and became a member of the Parliamentary Young Members' Group and advocated liberal principles. After he finished his pupillage, Szemere went back to Borsod where he was elected as an honorary notary public.

In 1835 Szemere travelled around the  world and visited amongst other places Berlin, Amsterdam, Dublin, Lausanne, Paris and London. During his visit Szemere realised that Hungary was less developed than he thought. Szemere also saw other countries' prejudice about Hungary. Szemere wrote down his experience, and how foreign institutions developed and worked. He published his diary,  ("Travelling abroad") in 1840. Even though Szemere finished it in 1839, he couldn't publish it then because of censorship. Szemere's diary made him famous and he became a member of the Hungarian Academy of Sciences. His work was republished.

Between 18411847 Szemere was a judge in Borsod county. Szemere became a congressman with László Palóczy in Pressburg. Szemere was one of the most important leaders of the Opposition 18431866 and 18471848 Diet. In the 18471848 Diet Szemere also became the recorder.

Minister and Prime Minister

In 1848 Szemere was the Home Secretary of the Batthyány Government. Szemere's task was to set up the new parliament. In the Hungarian Military Association he was responsible for justice. From 1848 Szemere was responsible for Upper-Hungary as a politician, therefore he was at Miskolc to reorganize the Upper-Tisza Legion, which had retreated after Franz Schlik's attack. From 2 May 1849 Szemere was Home Secretary and Prime Minister alongside Regent Lajos Kossuth, until his resignation.

The Government ended martial law and worked on the emancipation from serfdom. On 29 July 1849 they accepted the national act which provided free language use for ethnic groups in local administration and education. The government's aim was to win the support of the ethnic groups for the Hungarian Revolution of 1848.

Emigration

After the Hungarian surrender at Világos Szemere buried the Holy Crown of Hungary, the Sceptre, the orb and other regalia on 23 August 1849 at Orsova. He escaped to Turkey, and later emigrated to Paris. In 1851 the Austrian Empire sentenced him to death in absentia.

Szemere supported the Austro-Hungarian Compromise of 1867 and because of this his relationship with Kossuth became worse. Szemere attacked the Hungarian Revolution's leaders in his pamphlet ( ("Hungarian Emigration" )) and in another work ( ("Political Word-picture")). Szemere attacked Kossuth too. During his emigration Szemere wrote a travelogue  ("Journeys in the East").

In 1865 Szemere successfully requested a pardon, but he was mentally ill by that time. In 1869 Szemere died and his ashes were interred in Buda, but on 1 May 1871 they were disinterred and moved to a church in the Avas district of Miskolc.

Sources

External links
 
 
 
 
 

1812 births
1869 deaths
People from Borsod-Abaúj-Zemplén County
Prime Ministers of Hungary
People of the Revolutions of 1848
Hungarian Interior Ministers
Members of the Hungarian Academy of Sciences
19th-century Hungarian politicians
19th-century Hungarian poets
Hungarian male poets
19th-century Hungarian male writers